Joseph Addison Woodward (April 11, 1806 – August 3, 1885) was an American politician who served as a U.S. Representative from South Carolina.

He was son of William Woodward. Born in Winnsboro, South Carolina, Woodward received an academic training and was graduated from the University of South Carolina at Columbia. He was admitted to the bar and practiced law.

Woodward served as member of the State house of representatives from 1834 to 1835 from 1840 to 1841.

Woodward was elected as a Democrat to the Twenty-eighth and to the four succeeding Congresses (March 4, 1843 – March 3, 1853).  He declined to be a candidate for reelection in 1852 to the Thirty-third Congress.

He relocated to Alabama and resumed his legal career after leaving Congress.

Woodward was a slave owner.

He died in Talladega, Alabama, on August 3, 1885.  He was interred in Oak Hill Cemetery.

References

Sources

1806 births
1885 deaths
Democratic Party members of the South Carolina House of Representatives
Democratic Party members of the United States House of Representatives from South Carolina
19th-century American politicians
University of South Carolina alumni